Gur Saruiyeh (also Romanized as Gūr Sārū’īyeh; also known as Gūr-e Sārūn and Gūr Sārūn) is a village in Rabor Rural District, in the Central District of Rabor County, Kerman Province, Iran. At the 2006 census, its population was 49, in 14 families.

References 

Populated places in Rabor County